Bergne is a surname. Notable people with the surname include:

 John Brodribb Bergne (1800–1873), English numismatist and antiquary
 Paul Bergne (1937–2007), British diplomat and historian
 Sebastian Bergne (born 1966), British industrial designer

See also
 Mount Bergne